Laxman Rajbanshi was the founding principal of the Siddhartha Vanasthali Institute and a member of the Nepalese parliament. He had also authored many books in Nepali as well as Nepal Bhasa. Some of his works in Nepal Bhasa to be translated into English include Red Sun and other stories, Uncertain Future and other stories, etc.

See also
Siddhartha Vanasthali Institute

References

Nepalese politicians
Nepalese educators
Members of the 2nd Nepalese Constituent Assembly